Hancockia californica is a species of sea slug, an Eastern Pacific Ocean nudibranch, a marine, opisthobranch gastropod mollusk in the family Hancockiidae.

Distribution
This marine species occurs off California, USA., Baja California, Mexico.

References

 Behrens, D., (1991) Pacific Coast Nudibranchs.
 MacFarland, F.M. (1923) The morphology of the nudibranch genus Hancockia. Journal of Morphology, 38(1): 65–104, Pls 1–6.
 MacFarland, F. M. (1966) Studies of opisthobranchiate mollusks of the Pacific coast of North America. Memoirs of the California Academy of Sciences, 6: 1–546, pls. 1–72.
Turgeon, D.; Quinn, J.F.; Bogan, A.E.; Coan, E.V.; Hochberg, F.G.; Lyons, W.G.; Mikkelsen, P.M.; Neves, R.J.; Roper, C.F.E.; Rosenberg, G.; Roth, B.; Scheltema, A.; Thompson, F.G.; Vecchione, M.; Williams, J.D. (1998). Common and scientific names of aquatic invertebrates from the United States and Canada: mollusks. 2nd ed. American Fisheries Society Special Publication, 26. American Fisheries Society: Bethesda, MD (USA). . IX, 526 + cd-rom pp.

Hancockiidae
Gastropods described in 1923